In number theory, an additive function is an arithmetic function f(n) of the positive integer variable n such that whenever a and b are coprime, the function applied to the product ab is the sum of the values of the function applied to a and b:

Completely additive 
An additive function f(n) is said to be completely additive if  holds for all positive integers a and b, even when they are not coprime.  Totally additive is also used in this sense by analogy with totally multiplicative functions. If f is a completely additive function then f(1) = 0.

Every completely additive function is additive, but not vice versa.

Examples 

Examples of arithmetic functions which are completely additive are:

 The restriction of the logarithmic function to 
 The multiplicity of a prime factor p in n, that is the largest exponent m for which pm divides n.
 a0(n) – the sum of primes dividing n counting multiplicity, sometimes called sopfr(n), the potency of n or the integer logarithm of n . For example:

a0(4) = 2 + 2 = 4
a0(20) =  a0(22 · 5) = 2 + 2 + 5 = 9
a0(27) = 3 + 3 + 3 = 9
a0(144) = a0(24 · 32) = a0(24) + a0(32) = 8 + 6 = 14
a0(2000) = a0(24 · 53) = a0(24) + a0(53) = 8 + 15 = 23
a0(2003) = 2003
a0(54,032,858,972,279) = 1240658
a0(54,032,858,972,302) = 1780417
a0(20,802,650,704,327,415) = 1240681

 The function Ω(n), defined as the total number of prime factors of n, counting multiple factors multiple times, sometimes called the "Big Omega function" . For example;

Ω(1) = 0, since 1 has no prime factors
Ω(4) = 2
Ω(16) = Ω(2·2·2·2) = 4
Ω(20) = Ω(2·2·5) = 3
Ω(27) = Ω(3·3·3) = 3
Ω(144) = Ω(24 · 32) = Ω(24) + Ω(32) = 4 + 2 = 6
Ω(2000) = Ω(24 · 53) = Ω(24) + Ω(53) = 4 + 3 = 7
Ω(2001) = 3
Ω(2002) = 4
Ω(2003) = 1
Ω(54,032,858,972,279) = Ω(11 ⋅ 19932 ⋅ 1236661) = 4  ;
Ω(54,032,858,972,302) = Ω(2 ⋅ 72 ⋅ 149 ⋅ 2081 ⋅ 1778171) = 6 
Ω(20,802,650,704,327,415) = Ω(5 ⋅ 7 ⋅ 112 ⋅ 19932 ⋅ 1236661) = 7.

Examples of arithmetic functions which are additive but not completely additive are:

 ω(n), defined as the total number of distinct prime factors of n . For example:

ω(4) = 1
ω(16) = ω(24) = 1
ω(20) = ω(22 · 5) = 2
ω(27) = ω(33) = 1
ω(144) = ω(24 · 32) = ω(24) + ω(32) = 1 + 1 = 2
ω(2000) = ω(24 · 53) = ω(24) + ω(53) = 1 + 1 = 2
ω(2001) = 3
ω(2002) = 4
ω(2003) = 1
ω(54,032,858,972,279) = 3
ω(54,032,858,972,302) = 5
ω(20,802,650,704,327,415) = 5

 a1(n) – the sum of the distinct primes dividing n, sometimes called sopf(n) . For example:

a1(1) = 0
a1(4) = 2
a1(20) = 2 + 5 = 7
a1(27) = 3
a1(144) = a1(24 · 32) = a1(24) + a1(32) = 2 + 3 = 5
a1(2000) = a1(24 · 53) = a1(24) + a1(53) = 2 + 5 = 7
a1(2001) = 55
a1(2002) = 33
a1(2003) = 2003
a1(54,032,858,972,279) = 1238665
a1(54,032,858,972,302) = 1780410
a1(20,802,650,704,327,415) = 1238677

Multiplicative functions 

One such example is

Summatory functions 

The summatory functions over  can be expanded as  where

The average of the function  is also expressed by these functions as

There is always an absolute constant  such that for all natural numbers ,

Let

Suppose that  is an additive function with  

Then  where  is the Gaussian distribution function

Examples of this result related to the prime omega function and the numbers of prime divisors of shifted primes include the following for fixed  where the relations hold for :

See also 
 Sigma additivity
 Prime omega function
 Multiplicative function
 Arithmetic function

References

Further reading 

 Janko Bračič, Kolobar aritmetičnih funkcij (Ring of arithmetical functions), (Obzornik mat, fiz. 49 (2002) 4, pp. 97–108)  (MSC (2000) 11A25) 
 Iwaniec and Kowalski, Analytic number theory, AMS (2004). 

Arithmetic functions